Carpacoce is a genus of flowering plants in the family Rubiaceae. All species are endemic to the Cape Floristic Region of South Africa.

Species
Carpacoce burchellii Puff
Carpacoce curvifolia Puff
Carpacoce gigantea Puff (apparently extinct)
Carpacoce heteromorpha (H.Buek) Bolus
Carpacoce scabra (Thunb.) Sond.
Carpacoce scabra subsp. rupestris Puff
Carpacoce scabra subsp. scabra 
Carpacoce spermacocea (Rchb. ex Spreng.) Sond. 
Carpacoce spermacocea subsp. orientalis Puff
Carpacoce spermacocea subsp. spermacocea 
Carpacoce vaginellata Salter

References

External links
Kew World Checklist of Selected Plant Families, Carpacoce 

Rubiaceae genera
Anthospermeae
Flora of the Cape Provinces
Taxa named by Otto Wilhelm Sonder